Echinopsis uyupampensis,  is a species of Echinopsis found in Bolivia and Peru.

Description
Echinopsis uyupampensis grows shrubby with several branches that lie down to ascending. The slim cylindrical shoots have a diameter of up to 3 centimeters and are up to 200 centimeters long. There are nine narrow and flat ribs that are not very high. The small areoles on them are light brown. From them spring eight to ten irregularly arranged spines, which are thickened at their base. The spines have a length of 0.2 to 0.6 centimeters.

The funnel-shaped, white flowers are reddish on the outside, up to 16 centimeters long. As with all Echinopsis the flower buds are covered with hairs.

References

External links
 
 

uyupampensis